Nicolás Alexander Maturana Caneo (born 8 July 1993) is a Chilean professional footballer who plays for Chilean club Cobreloa as a forward.

Club career
He debuted on 23 April 2011, in a 0-0 draw of Universidad de Chile against Palestino for the 2011 Torneo Apertura. He was replaced by Diego Rivarola at the minute 53. He scored his first goal on 10 July 2011, in a match against Magallanes, for the 2011 Copa Chile. in 2015, he was loaned to La Liga side Elche CF, but the team couldn't register him, so after Maturana was loaned to Alcoyano.

International career
He was named in Chile's senior squad for 2018 FIFA World Cup qualifiers against Paraguay and Bolivia in September 2016.

Personal life

Honours

Club
Universidad de Chile
Primera División de Chile (1): 2011 Apertura, 2011–C
Copa Sudamericana (1): 2011

Deportes Iquique
Copa Chile (1): 2013–14

Colo-Colo
Primera División de Chile (1): 2017 Transición
Supercopa de Chile (2): 2017, 2018
Copa Chile (1): 2019

References

External links

1993 births
Living people
Footballers from Santiago
Chilean footballers
Chile under-20 international footballers
Chilean expatriate footballers
Chilean Primera División players
Segunda División Profesional de Chile players
Primera B de Chile players
Segunda División B players
Liga MX players
Association football wingers
Universidad de Chile footballers
Rangers de Talca footballers
A.C. Barnechea footballers
Deportes Iquique footballers
Elche CF players
CD Alcoyano footballers
Club Deportivo Palestino footballers
Club Necaxa footballers
Colo-Colo footballers
Universidad de Concepción footballers
Cobreloa footballers
Chilean expatriate sportspeople in Spain
Chilean expatriate sportspeople in Mexico
Expatriate footballers in Spain
Expatriate footballers in Mexico